The Plaza of the Americas is a major center of student activity on the campus of the  University of Florida in Gainesville, Florida. It is located in the quad between Library West, Peabody Hall, the University Auditorium, and the Chemistry Building.

In 2008, the Plaza of the Americas became a contributing property in the University of Florida Campus Historic District, which had been added to the National Register of Historic Places on April 20, 1989.

History 
In 1925, landscape architect Frederick Law Olmsted, Jr. developed the plans to improve the plaza. In 1931, the space was officially designated the Plaza of the Americas at the first meeting of the Institute of Inter-American Affairs. The students planted 21 trees around the plaza.  They dedicated the newly planted trees to the 21 countries that were invited to the meeting.
Today, the quad is the unofficial forum for the University of Florida where students and organizations present their ideals.

A $2.2 million renovation of the Plaza of the Americas, which included additional landscaping, benches, and sidewalks, was begun in November 2016. The project was completed a year later, and a dedication ceremony for the renovated plaza was held on November 17, 2017.

See also 
 University of Florida
 Buildings at the University of Florida
 Campus Historic District

References

External links
 from the University of Florida Physical Plant Division
Additional info about the Plaza from the University of Florida Interactive Media Lab 
Alligator does story on the Plaza from alligator.org

1925 establishments in Florida
Buildings at the University of Florida
Historic American Landscapes Survey in Florida
Historic district contributing properties in Florida
National Register of Historic Places in Gainesville, Florida
Parks in Alachua County, Florida
Tourist attractions in Gainesville, Florida
University and college buildings on the National Register of Historic Places in Florida
University and college buildings completed in 1925